The 1926 Klass I season was the fourth season of the Klass I, the top level of ice hockey in Sweden. It was won by Södertälje SK.

Final standings

External links
1926 season

Klass I seasons
1
Swedish